Waconia High School is a public high school located in Waconia, Minnesota, United States. A part of Waconia Public Schools, the school has an enrollment of approximately 1,200 students in grades 9 through 12 and serves the communities of Waconia, St. Bonifacius, Minnetrista, Victoria and New Germany.

History
After a previous 2011 referendum failed, a November 2014 referendum to expand Clearwater Middle School and turn it in to a new high school passed.

Demographics
WHS is 92% white, 4% Hispanic, 1% black and 1% Asian. 1% of students also identify as a part of two or more races.

Academics
Advanced Placement program classes are offered at Waconia. About forty percent of WHS students take at least one AP class at some point in high school.

Athletics
After previously competing in the Wright County Conference, Wildcat teams moved to the Metro West Conference in advance of the 2020–2021 school year.

State championships
 Baseball: 2017
 Dance: 1984, 1989, 1990, 1991, 1997 (high kick/precision), 1999 (tie; jazz/funk)
 Boys golf: 1977, 1978, 1979, 1980

Performing arts
Waconia has two competitive show choirs: the Varsity-level "Power Company", the Junior varsity-level mixed group "The Current", and formerly, the Junior varsity-level women's group "Illuminations". The show choir program also hosts the annual Waconia Star Power show choir competition the third weekend of February.

The band program hosts The Lake Waconia Band Festival every year in the third week of June.

Notable alumni
 Maxx Williams, NFL tight end
 Jenn Bostic, singer/songwriter

References

Public high schools in Minnesota
Schools in Carver County, Minnesota